The European Network of Picturebook Research is a pioneering network of European-based scholars researching picture books from around the world.

The Network was founded in Barcelona in 2007, at the suggestion of Bettina Kümmerling-Meibauer. Its core group includes children's literature scholars Evelyn Arizpe, Teresa Colomer, Elina Druker, Bettina Kümmerling-Meibauer, Maria Nikolajeva, and Cecilia Silva-Díaz. Since 2007, it has held a biannual international conference.

1st Conference, 2007
Conference theme: New Impulses in Picturebook Research: Aesthetic and cognitive aspects of picturebooks
Location and organisers: University of Barcelona (organised by Teresa Colomer and Cecilia Silva-Díaz)

2nd Conference, 2009
Conference theme: Beyond Borders: Art, narrative and culture in picturebooks
Location and organisers: University of Glasgow (organised by Evelyn Arizpe and Maureen Farrell

3rd Conference, 2011
Conference theme: History and Theory of the Picturebook
Location and organisers: University of Tübingen (organised by Bettina Kümmerling-Meibauer)

4th Conference, 2013
Conference theme: Picturebooks as Meeting Places: Text, image, ideology
Location and organisers: University of Stockholm (organised by Elina Drucker)

5th Conference, 2015
Conference theme: Picturebooks, Democracy and Social Change
Location and organisers: University of Gdansk (organised by Malgorzata Cackowska)

6th Conference, 2017
Conference theme: Home and Lived-In Spaces in Picturebooks from the 1950s to the Present
Location and organisers: University of Padova (organised by Marnie Campagnaro)
Publications:
 Ricerche Di Pedagogia E Didattica. Journal of Theories and Research in Education, 14(2), 1–8. https://doi.org/10.6092/issn.1970-2221/10029

7th Conference, 2019
Conference theme: Verbal and Visual Strategies in Nonfiction Picturebooks
Location and organisers: Western Norway University of Applied Sciences (organised by Nina Goga, Sarah Hoem Iversen and Anne-Stefi Teigland

8th Conference, 2021
Conference theme: Picture Books in Time
Location and organisers: Tel Aviv University (organised by Yael Darr)

See also
 Picture book

External links
 Children's Picture Book Database at Miami University
 Planet Picture Book (picture books from around the world)
 International Research Society for Children's Literature (IRSCL)

References

Visual arts media
Books by type
Picture books